Jefferson County Schools is the operating school district within Jefferson County, West Virginia. It is governed by the Jefferson County Board of Education.

Schools

High schools
Jefferson High School 
Washington High School

Middle schools
Charles Town Middle School
Harpers Ferry Middle School
Shepherdstown Middle School
Wildwood Middle School

Elementary schools
Blue Ridge Primary School
Blue Ridge Elementary School
C.W. Shipley Elementary School
Driswood Elementary School
North Jefferson Elementary School
Page-Jackson Elementary School
Ranson Elementary School
Shepherdstown Elementary School
South Jefferson Elementary School
T.A. Lowery Elementary School
Wright Denny Intermediate School (3-5)

Schools no longer in operation
Bakerton School
Charles Town High School
Charles Town Junior High School
Eagle Avenue School
Edgewood School
Harpers Ferry High School
Harpers Ferry Junior High School
Jefferson High Ninth Grade Complex
Kabletown Elementary
Kearneysville Elementary
Middleway Elementary
Millville Elementary
Page-Jackson High School
Ranson Kindergarten Center
Rippon Elementary
Shenandoah Junction Elementary
Shepherdstown High School
Shepherdstown Junior High School
Summit Point Elementary

External links
Jefferson County Schools
Jefferson High School Alumni website

School districts in West Virginia
Education in Jefferson County, West Virginia